is a mecha anime series that aired from 1983 to 1984 in Japan. There were 43 episodes aired. Other loosely translated names include Sasuryger, Sasreiger, Galaxy Whirlwind Sasuraiger and Wonder Six. It is the sequel to Galactic Gale Baxingar and the final entry of the J9 Series. 

The original concept was adopted from the novel Around the World in Eighty Days.

The anime was available in Indonesia in the form of VHS and Betamax with the title "Wonder Six". The name referenced the six characters who were on the adventure. The Tv series is currently licensed for English language release by Discotek Media.

Plot Summary 
It is the year 2911 and the solar system is made up of 50 planets. I.C Blues, a gambler, makes a bet with the boss of a criminal syndicate known as Bloody God that it is possible to navigate the entire solar system in one year. Helping out Blues is the J9-III team, made up of Rock, Beat, and Birdy, who have purchased a super robot capable of transforming into a train from the space merchant D.D Richman. This robot is Sasuraiger.

As Blues and the JJ9 team start the challenge, it soon becomes evident that the Bloody Syndicate will do anything to ensure the JJ9 team loses the bet.

Staff
 Creator  Yuu Yamamoto
 Director  Takao Yotsuji
 Additional Directors  Jouhei Matsuura  Hideki Takayama
 Character Design  Kazuo Komatsubara
Mecha Design  Hiroshi Ohnishi

Characters

Robots
 Sasuraiger/J9-III go
 Eadle BG-9
 Souzer EM-3
 Stikk EP1-4
 Birdrun VIC5

Merchandise
The toy was originally called Batrain when released by Takatoku in Japan. The Batrain stickers on the model could be removed to reveal Sasuraiger stickers underneath.
The Sasuraiger toy was released under the name Fast Track in the Convertors toy line in the U.S.

Video games
The robots have been featured in Super Robot Wars GC along with Braiger and Baxingar. However, unlike its predecessors, none of the enemies from the anime appear in the game.

External links
 
 CollectionDX

1983 anime television series debuts
Television shows based on Around the World in Eighty Days
Adventure anime and manga
Super robot anime and manga